St Paul's Church is in Brook Street, Macclesfield, Cheshire, England.  It is an active Anglican parish church in the deanery of Macclesfield, the archdeaconry of Macclesfield, and the diocese of Chester.  The church is recorded in the National Heritage List for England as a designated Grade II listed building.  It was a Commissioners' church, having received a grant towards its construction from the Church Building Commission.

History
St Paul's was built in 1843–44 to a design by William Hayley.  A grant of £1,000 was given towards its construction by the Church Building Commission.  The total cost of construction was £5,000.

Architecture

Exterior
The church is constructed in rubble stone with slate roofs.  Its architectural style is Perpendicular.  The plan consists of a nave with a clerestory, north and south six-bay aisles, a short chancel, and a west tower with a recessed spire.  The tower is in three stages with a wide west doorway over which is a three-light window.  In the middle stage are blind traceried arcades and a central roundel.  In the top stage are paired bell openings.  At the summit of the tower is a stepped parapet with pinnacles at the centres and corner.  The spire contains lucarnes.  At the west end of the aisles are doorways with rose windows above them.  Along the sides of the aisles are buttresses between the bays.  Each bay contains a two-light window, and there are similar windows along the clerestory.  The sides of the chancel contain lancet windows, and the east window has four lights.

Interior
Inside the church are five-bay arcades carried on octagonal piers, and a west gallery.  Between the nave and the chancel is a screen with an integral pulpit.  In the chancel is a reredos containing mosaic, and sediliae on both the north and south sides.  In the eastern bay of the chancel the roof is painted with stencil work.  The stained glass in the east window dates from 1921, it is by Walter J. Pearce, and it depicts Suffer the Children.  The three-manual organ was built in 1911 by Alex Young and Sons.

See also

List of Commissioners' churches in Northeast and Northwest England
Listed buildings in Macclesfield

References

Church of England church buildings in Cheshire
Grade II listed churches in Cheshire
Churches completed in 1844
19th-century Church of England church buildings
Gothic Revival church buildings in England
Gothic Revival architecture in Cheshire
Diocese of Chester
Commissioners' church buildings
Paul